Sidney Anderson Kinnear, CBE (1902 – 1985) was the first  HM Chief Inspector of Constabulary for Scotland to come from a police rather than a military background.

Notes

Scottish police officers
Chief Inspectors of Constabulary (Scotland)
Law enforcement in Scotland
Officers in Scottish police forces
1902 births
1985 deaths
Commanders of the Order of the British Empire